Aeger is a genus of fossil prawns. They first occur in the Middle Triassic, and died out at the end of the Late Cretaceous. A total of 21 species are known.

Species
 Aeger brevirostris
 Aeger brodiei
 Aeger elegans
 Aeger elongatus
 Aeger foersteri
 Aeger fraconicus
 Aeger gracilis
 Aeger hidalguensis
 Aeger insignis
 Aeger laevis
 Aeger lehmanni
 Aeger libanensis
 Aeger luxii
 Aeger macropus
 Aeger marderi
 Aeger muensteri
 Aeger robustus
 Aeger rostrospinatus
 Aeger spinipes
 Aeger straeleni
 Aeger tipularius

References

Dendrobranchiata
Prehistoric Malacostraca
Prehistoric crustacean genera
Jurassic crustaceans
Prehistoric life of Europe
Middle Triassic genus first appearances
Late Cretaceous genus extinctions